Ganz is a surname. Notable people with the surname include:

 Ábrahám Ganz, Swiss merchant and founder of the Ganz companies
 Bruno Ganz (1941–2019), Swiss actor
 Caterina Ganz (born 1995), Italian cross-country skier
 Edwin F. Ganz, American politician
 Joan Ganz Cooney, American businesswoman and television producer
 Josef Ganz, German car designer
 Lowell Ganz, American screenwriter
 Maurizio Ganz, Italian footballer
 Megan Ganz, American comedy writer
 Peter Ganz (1920–2006), Germanist
 P. Felix Ganz (1922–1990), American stamp collector
 Rhonda Ganz, Canadian poet and illustrator
 Rudolph Ganz, Swiss pianist, conductor, and composer
 Valerie Ganz, Welsh painter
 Victor Ganz (1913–1987), art collector

Fictional
 Sebastian Ganz, fictional character

Ganț 
 Ovidiu Victor Ganţ (born 1966, Detta, Banat), Romanian politician of Banat-Swabian origin

See also 
 Benny Gantz, general in the Israel Defense Forces
 Frank Ganz (Gansz), former Head Coach of the Kansas City Chiefs
 Ganzs
 Gantz
 Ganz (disambiguation)
 Gans (disambiguation)
 Gants (disambiguation)
 Gant (disambiguation)
 Gantt (disambiguation)

German-language surnames
Jewish surnames

de:Ganz
fr:Ganz
hu:Ganz (egyértelműsítő lap)
ja:ガンツ
nl:Ganz
ru:Ганц
sk:Ganz (rozlišovacia stránka)